Patrick Lawless (fl.1691 – 1719), known as Piatricio Laules in Spain, was an Irish Jacobite soldier who became a diplomat in the service of Philip V of Spain.

Lawless was the son of Walter Lawless of Kilkenny and Ann Bryan. By 1691, he was in the service of James II's Jacobite army in Ireland. He fought in the Williamite War in Ireland, being taken prisoner after the Battle of Aughrim. Released following the Treaty of Limerick, he joined the Flight of the Wild Geese to France where he was appointed a gentleman of the bedchamber to the exiled king and later to James Francis Edward Stuart, the Old Pretender. The Pretender chose Lawless as his envoy to Philip V of Spain, who made Lawless the commander of the Regiment of Hibernia.

After the Peace of Utrecht, Philip V appointed Lawless to be the Spanish ambassador to Anne, Queen of Great Britain. This caused concern among the Whig faction and was a complaint in the impeachment of Robert Harley, Earl of Oxford, with Harley accused of "receiving Patrick Lawless, an Irish Papist, as a foreign minister, and causing several sums of money to be payed to him". Lawless nonetheless retained the ambassadorship to Great Britain after the death of Queen Anne in 1714, and he later served as Philip's ambassador to France and as lieutenant general and governor of Majorca. He is last heard of in 1718 as an associate of Peter Redmond.

References

Year of birth uncertain
Year of death uncertain
18th-century Irish people
Ambassadors of Spain to France
Ambassadors of Spain to Great Britain
Irish Jacobites
Irish soldiers in the army of James II of England
Irish soldiers in the Spanish Army
Regiment of Hibernia
Spanish people of Irish descent